The family name Cheriqui or Cheriki is a Sephardi Jewish surname derived from the fortress municipality of Xèrica in Spain, between Zaragoza and Valencia. The Arabic name of the municipality is H̱īrīkā. Variants of the family names comprise Chriqui, Chrequi, and Chreki, as well as Sreki and Sriki. Cheriqui is documented as a Jewish family name in Morocco in the first half of the 16th century.

Shriki or Shriqui, Chriqui is a variant of Asharqui and Esharqui, Arabic words meaning "Oriental/Easterner". In the Iberian peninsula they are linked to Sharquia, the eastern part of Spain covering the regions of Alicante, Almeria and Cartagena. In old Spanish documents, the two Arabic Jewish names are found as Axarqui and Exarquino. Diminutive forms comprise Ashriqui, Eshriqui, Chriqui and Shriqui. Eshriqui and Shuriqui are recorded in the 18th century. Shriqui is found in the 19th century.

It may refer to:
Emmanuelle Chriqui (born 1977), Canadian film and television actress
Idan Shriki (born 1981), Israeli football player
Liran Shriki (born 1994), Israeli football player
Shlomo Shriki (born 1949), Moroccan-born Israeli painter and artist

References

Arab-Jewish surnames
Maghrebi Jewish surnames
Arabic-language surnames
Surnames of Moroccan origin
Sephardic surnames